Diastema is a genus of flowering plant in the family Gesneriaceae containing approximately 20 species ranging from Mexico to Bolivia and Venezuela.

Species
Diastema contains at least 20 valid species as of 2013.
Diastema affine Fritsch
Diastema comiferum (DC.) Benth. ex Walp.
Diastema eggersianum Fritsch 
Diastema gymnoleuca Gilli 
Diastema hispidum (DC.) Fritsch 
Diastema incisum Benth. 
Diastema kalbreyeri Fritsch 
Diastema latiflora Rusby 
Diastema lehmannii Regel 
Diastema maculatum (Poepp.) Benth. ex Walp. 
Diastema micranthum Donn.Sm. 
Diastema purpurascens Rusby 
Diastema racemiferum Benth. 
Diastema rupestre Brandegee 
Diastema scabrum (Poepp.) Benth. ex Walp. 
Diastema sodiroanum Fritsch 	
Diastema tenerrimum (Poepp.) Benth. ex Walp. 	
Diastema urticifolium (Poepp.) Benth. ex Walp. 
Diastema vexans H.E.Moore 
Diastema weberbaueri Fitsch 
Diastema williamsii Rusby

References

External links

Gesnerioideae
Gesneriaceae genera